Erik (also known as the Phantom of the Opera, commonly referred to as the Phantom) is the title character from Gaston Leroux's 1910 novel Le Fantôme de l'Opéra, best known to English speakers as The Phantom of the Opera. The character has been adapted to alternative media several times, including in the 1925 film adaptation starring Lon Chaney, the 1943 remake starring Claude Rains and Andrew Lloyd Webber's 1986 musical.

Character history
In the original novel, few details are given regarding Erik's past. The novel confirms that Erik has traveled to multiple countries including France, Russia, Persia, and northern Vietnam, learning various arts and sciences from each region. Erik himself laments the fact that his mother was horrified by his birth deformity, and that his father, a true master mason, never saw him. Most of the character's history is revealed by a mysterious figure, known through most of the novel as The Persian or the Daroga, who saved Erik's life in Persia, and followed Erik to Paris; other details are discussed in the novel's epilogue (e.g., his birthplace is given as a small town outside of Rouen, France). In the novel, Erik often refers to himself in the third person, a detail that didn't make it into any subsequent adaptations.

Phantom 
Many different versions of Erik's life are told through other adaptations such as films, television shows, books, and musicals. One such popular literary adaptation is the Susan Kay novel Phantom (1990), a fictional in-depth story of Erik from the time of his birth to the end of his life at the Paris Opera House.

For the most part, Kay's novel stays in context with Erik's life history as laid down by Leroux.  However, Kay (as explained in her Author's Note) changes and shapes the character to match her own vision, influenced by other adaptations besides the original. In addition, the ending/resolution is quite different from Leroux's. The story follows Erik through his entire life, starting with the night of his birth, and is told from different viewpoints throughout the novel (Erik's mother, Erik, Nadir/the Persian, Christine, and Raoul). Kay places the highest priority on portraying romantic aspects of Erik's life.

Yeston and Kopit 
The theatrical songwriting team of Maury Yeston and Arthur Kopit created a musical based on the novel, Phantom, which investors backed out of after Webber's version became a huge hit. In this version, Erik has spent his entire life living beneath the Opera. Over the years, he became possessive of the Opera, and the creative driving force for the company. No artistic decision is made without Gerard Carriere seeking his approval.

He offers to teach Christine Daaé to sing after hearing her working in the costume shop, and falls in love with her.

This storyline was also the basis for the 1990 miniseries starring Charles Dance, Teri Polo, and Burt Lancaster as Carriere.

The Canary Trainer
In Nicholas Meyer's 1993 novel The Canary Trainer, Sherlock Holmes develops several theories as to the Phantom's identity. His first idea is that he is an employee of the Opera; however, when the Phantom's knowledge of the Opera becomes evident, Holmes then believes that he is Charles Garnier, having faked his own death. When Garnier's corpse is identified, Holmes then theorizes that the Phantom was Edouard LaFosse, the (fictional) assistant of Garnier who designed much of the Opera's interior and who allegedly died after a building collapse. Holmes theorizes that he did not die, but was merely disfigured and therefore took to hiding in the Opera. However, when Holmes finally confronts the Phantom, he claims that he cannot speak without his mask, as his mother forced him to wear it whenever he wished to speak as a child, and he is not Edouard LaFosse. Holmes therefore admits that he is not sure how true any of the theories or claims of the Phantom's identity are. The Phantom never provides a given name in the novel; he only tells Christine that his name is "Nobody.”

Regardless of his identity, the Phantom in The Canary Trainer is much more unhinged and bloodthirsty than in the original novel or play. For example, when killing Madame Giry's replacement with the chandelier, he kills "almost thirty men and women in the twinkling of an eye", just to ensure that he kills his main target. He is also more psychologically disturbed, to the extent that when he tells Holmes that he has been 'taught' not to speak without his mask, he is revealed to only be capable of communicating in snarls and other animalistic sounds when Holmes knocks the mask off in their final confrontation.

The Angel of the Opera
In Sam Siciliano's novel The Angel of the Opera, Sherlock Holmes is brought in to solve the case of the Opera Ghost, and both Erik's and Holmes's stories unfold through the eyes of Holmes's assistant, Henri Vernier. Siciliano places Holmes and Vernier at several of the crucial scenes in Erik and Christine's relationship, and draws parallels between Erik and Holmes. Holmes sympathizes with Erik so much that after Christine leaves him, Holmes brings him back to England. One of the first people that Erik meets on his arrival is a blind girl with a fondness for music.

Erik's deformity
In the original novel, Erik is described as corpse-like and is referred to as having a "death's-head" (human skull) throughout the story. He has no nose, and his eyes are sunken so deep in his skull that all that is seen are two eye sockets, except when his yellow eyes glow in the dark. His skin is yellowed and tightly stretched across his bones, and only a few wisps of dark brown hair are behind his ears and on his forehead.

His mouth is never described in as much detail, but is referred to as a “dead mouth” by Christine, and Erik acknowledges that his mouth is abnormal when lifting up his mask to display ventriloquism. He is described as extremely thin, so much so that he resembles a skeleton. Christine graphically describes his cold, bony hands, which also either feel or smell like death. There is debate among both English and French speakers as to whether the original French word used here, sentir, was intended by Leroux to mean "smells like" or "feels like,” as the French word is used for both feel and smell depending on the context.

Erik woefully describes himself to Christine as a corpse who is "built up with death from head to foot." According to the Persian, Erik was born with this deformity and was exhibited as le mort vivant in freak shows earlier in his life. Erik sometimes plays up his macabre appearance, such as sleeping in a coffin as if he is a vampire, he also costumes as the titular character from Edgar Allan Poe's The Masque of the Red Death for the masked ball.

Lon Chaney's characterization of Erik in the silent film The Phantom of the Opera (1925) remains closest to the book in content, in that Erik's face resembles a skull with an elongated nose slit and protruding, crooked teeth. In this version, Erik is said to have been deformed at birth. Chaney was a masterful make-up artist and was considered avant-garde for creating and applying Erik's facial make-up design himself. It is said that he kept it secret until the first day of filming. The result was allegedly so frightening to the women of the time that theaters showing the movie were cautioned to keep smelling salts on hand to revive those who fainted.

Several movies based on the novel vary the deformities. In Universal's 1943 adaptation, he is disfigured when the publisher's assistant throws etching acid in his face. In the musical horror film Phantom of the Paradise (1974), Winslow (the Phantom character) gets his head caught in a record-press, while the horror version (1989) starring Robert Englund has him selling his soul to Satan and having his face mutilated as a result. This version also has a gruesome variation on the mask, in which Erik is sewing flesh to his face.

In Andrew Lloyd Webber's 1986 musical adaptation, only half of Erik's face is deformed (thus the famous half-mask often associated with Erik's appearance.) His show was originally planned to have a full mask and full facial disfigurement, but when the director, Harold Prince, realized that it would make expression onstage very difficult, they halved the mask. The logo featuring a full mask was publicized before the change. The deformity in the musical includes a gash on the right side of his partially balding head with exposed skull tissue, an elongated right nostril, a missing right eyebrow, swollen lips, different colored eyes, and a wrinkled, warped right cheek. It is covered by a white half-mask and wig.

In the 2004 film adaptation of the musical, Erik's makeup was made to look much less gruesome than previous adaptations of the story. Instead of a skull-like face, his disfigurement resembles that of a face mildly malformed by a birthmark, which he covers with the mask. Film critic Roger Ebert noted that Butler was more "conventionally handsome" than his predecessors "in a GQ kind of way".

The 1998 film adaptation starring Julian Sands as Erik is notable in that the character is not deformed and has instead a classically handsome face.

Performers

Film
Onscreen, Erik has often been cast as a tragic hero but also a tragic villain, depending on the film's point of view.
 Lon Chaney in the 1925 American silent version by Rupert Julian, The Phantom of the Opera, starring Mary Philbin as Christine Daaé and Norman Kerry as Viscount Raoul de Chagny.
 Claude Rains in the 1943 Technicolor version of Phantom of the Opera. In this version, his full name was "Erique Claudin".
 Herbert Lom in the 1962 version of The Phantom of the Opera. In this version, his name was "Professor Petrie".
 William Finley in the 1974 rock-musical version of The Phantom of the Opera, Brian De Palma's Phantom of the Paradise.
 Robert Englund in the 1989 horror film version of The Phantom of the Opera. In this version, his full name was "Erik Destler".
 Julian Sands in Dario Argento's adaptation The Phantom of the Opera in 1998.
 Gerard Butler in the movie adaptation of Andrew Lloyd Webber's stage version The Phantom of the Opera (2004)

Television
 Maximilian Schell in the 1983 television film .
 Charles Dance in the 1990 NBC two-part television miniseries.

Theatre
 Edward Petherbridge, of the 1976 English play version.
 Peter Straker in Ken Hill's musical version in 1984.
 Richard White in Yeston/Kopit's stage version.

Andrew Lloyd Webber musical
See main list: The Phantom of the Opera

 Michael Crawford in the original cast of the 1986 Andrew Lloyd Webber musical in London's West End, the 1988 cast on Broadway and the 1989 cast in Los Angeles.
 Steve Barton played the role as well as the original Raoul in London
 Dave Willetts replaced Michael Crawford in the London cast when Crawford was cast to open the Broadway production in 1988.
 Martin Smith
 Timothy Nolen replaced Michael Crawford on Broadway when Crawford was cast to open the Los Angeles production in 1989, and is the first baritone Phantom, and the only bass baritone Phantom
 Robert Guillaume replaced Michael Crawford in Los Angeles, becoming the first African American Phantom in the US
 Colm Wilkinson (1989)
 Anthony Warlow in Australian performance of Andrew Lloyd Webber's musical (1990, 2007)
 Rob Guest, who subsequent to Anthony Warlow, played the role a record 2,289 times in the Australian production of Andrew Lloyd Webber's musical
 Howard McGillin, the longest-running Phantom 
 Anthony Crivello in Phantom: The Las Vegas Spectacular (2006–2012)
 John Owen-Jones The West End Production and the 2011–2013 tour
 Brad Little
 Gary Mauer
 Davis Gaines
 Simon Bowman
 Mark Jacoby
 Paul Stanley on stage in Toronto (1999)
 Kevin Gray becoming the first Asian American Phantom on Broadway
 Peter Karrie in the Toronto and West End productions
 John Cudia – Previous Phantom had portrayed both Raoul and the Phantom
 Thomas Borchert
 Earl Carpenter played the role in the London West End and the 2011–2013 tour
 Ramin Karimloo played both Raoul and The Phantom in the London West End, as well as The Phantom in the West End production of Love Never Dies, and played the Phantom in 25th Anniversary production of The Phantom of the Opera at Royal Albert Hall in 2011
 Ben Lewis in Love Never Dies Australian production – May 2011, as well as Phantom of the Opera in London until September 2018
 Peter Jöback – Previously played the Phantom in the West End and Broadway. Took over on Broadway in 2018 for the 30th anniversary
 Hugh Panaro – Previous Phantom had portrayed both Raoul and the Phantom and played the Phantom in the 25th-anniversary production on Broadway
 Norm Lewis played the Phantom until February 2015 becoming the first African American Phantom on Broadway
 James Barbour played the Phantom until December 2017

 Ben Forster played The Phantom until December 2017
 Jonathan Roxmouth – The Phantom of the Opera world tour 2012 as the youngest English-speaking phantom / 2019–2020 tour
 Killian Donnelly is playing the Phantom in London's West End in 2021

References

Characters in The Phantom of the Opera
Fictional architects
Male literary villains
Fictional hermits
Fictional illeists
Fictional murderers
Fictional pianists
Fictional violinists
Fictional French people
Literary characters introduced in 1909
Fictional characters with disfigurements
Male horror film villains